Ioannis Koutsis (born 1908, date of death unknown) was a Greek sports shooter. He competed at the 1952 Summer Olympics and the 1956 Summer Olympics.

References

1908 births
Year of death missing
Greek male sport shooters
Olympic shooters of Greece
Shooters at the 1952 Summer Olympics
Shooters at the 1956 Summer Olympics
Place of birth missing
Sportspeople from Piraeus
20th-century Greek people